Destination Unknown is a 1942 American thriller film directed by Ray Taylor and starring William Gargan, Irene Hervey and Sam Levene. It was made as a second feature film by Universal Pictures set in China in World War II.

Cast
William Gargan as Briggs Harrison
Irene Hervey as Elena Varnoff
Sam Levene as Victor
Turhan Bey as Muto
Keye Luke as Secretary
Felix Basch as Karl Renner

Production
Filming started April 1942.

References

External links
Destination Unknown at TCMDB
Destination Unknown at BFI
Destination Unknown at IMDb

1942 films
Universal Pictures films
Films set in China
World War II films made in wartime
Pacific War films
1940s thriller films
American thriller films
American black-and-white films
Japan in non-Japanese culture
Films directed by Ray Taylor